Mizan Rahman (September 16, 1932 – January 5, 2015) was a Bangladeshi Canadian mathematician and writer. He specialized in fields of mathematics such as hypergeometric series and orthogonal polynomials. He also had interests encompassing literature, philosophy, scientific skepticism, freethinking and rationalism. He co-authored Basic Hypergeometric Series with George Gasper. This book is widely considered as the standard work of choice for that subject of study. He also published ten Bengali books.

Education and career
Rahman was born and grew up in East Bengal, British India (nowadays Bangladesh). He studied at the University of Dhaka, where he obtained his B.Sc degree in Mathematics and Physics in 1953, and his M.Sc in Applied Mathematics in 1954. He received a B.A in Mathematics from the University of Cambridge in 1958, and an M.A. in mathematics from the same university in 1963. He was a senior lecturer at the University of Dhaka from 1958 until 1962. Rahman went to the University of New Brunswick of Canada in 1962 and received his Ph.D in 1965 with a thesis on the kinetic theory of plasma using singular integral equation techniques. After his Ph.D, he became an assistant professor, later a full professor, at Carleton University, where he spent the rest of his career, after his retirement as a Distinguished Professor Emeritus. He unexpectedly died in Ottawa on January 5, 2015 at the age of 82.

Writing and other activities
Apart from his teaching and academic activities, Rahman wrote on various issues, particularly on those related to Bangladesh. He contributed to Internet blogs and various internet e-magazines, mainly in the Bengali language, covering his interests. He was a  prolific writer  and a regular contributor to Porshi, a Bengali monthly publication based in Silicon Valley, California.

He was also the member of the advisory board of the Mukto-Mona, an Internet congregation of freethinkers, rationalists, skeptics, atheists and humanists of mainly Bengali and South Asian descent.

Honors and awards
Best Teaching Award (1986)
Life-time membership in the Bharat Ganita Parishad (Indian Mathematical Society)
Fellow of the Bangladesh Academy of Sciences (2002)
Award of Excellence from Bangladesh Publications (Ottawa) (1996)

Books
English
 Basic Hypergeometric Series (Coauthor)
 Special Functions, q-Series and Related Topics (Coeditor)
 The Little Garden in the Corner (Prose)

Bengali

তীর্থ আমার গ্রাম (Tirtha is my village) (1994)
লাল নদী (The Red River) (2001)
অ্যালবাম (Album) (2002)
প্রসঙ্গ নারী (Context - Women) (2002)
অনন্যা আমার দেশ (Ananya is my country) (2004)
আনন্দ নিকেতন (Ananda Niketan) (2006)
দুর্যোগের পূর্বাভাস (Premonition) (2007)
শুধু মাটি নয় (Not just soil) (2009)
ভাবনার আত্মকথন (Autobiography of thought) (2010)
শূন্য (Zero) (2012)
শূন্য থেকে মহাবিশ্ব With Avijit Roy(The universe from zero)(2015)

References

External links
OP-SF NET 22.1, January 2015. Topic #1: Mizan Rahman 1932-2015 (a short obituary by Martin Muldoon)
A photo album in memory of Mizan Rahman (maintained by Tom Koornwinder)

Canadian mathematicians
Bangladeshi humanists
Bengali writers
University of Dhaka alumni
Alumni of the University of Cambridge
University of New Brunswick alumni
Bangladeshi emigrants to Canada
1932 births
2015 deaths
Academic staff of Carleton University